George C. Conway (December 15, 1900 – April 16, 1969) was an American politician who served in the Connecticut House of Representatives from the Guilford district from 1943 to 1949 and as the Attorney General of Connecticut from 1951 to 1953.

He died on April 16, 1969, in Middletown, Connecticut at age 68.

References

1900 births
1969 deaths
Republican Party members of the Connecticut House of Representatives
Connecticut Attorneys General
20th-century American politicians